Christine Choy (born 1952)  is a Chinese-American filmmaker. She is known for codirecting Who Killed Vincent Chin?, a 1988 film based on the murder of Vincent Jen Chin.

Early life 
Choy was born in Shanghai, China as Chai Ming Huei to a Korean father and a Chinese mother.
For the most part, Choy was raised by her mother because her father abandoned the family shortly after Choy's birth to return to his original home in South Korea. Growing up, the mother and daughter struggled financially.  Following the Cultural Revolution, the family fled mainland China via Hong Kong. They moved to South Korea, where Choy was reunited with her father. During this time, Choy developed a strong appreciation for American films released in South Korea. Although she enjoyed the films, Choy noticed there was discrimination towards the Asian people in American films.

In 1965, Choy was given a scholarship to attend Manhattanville College of the Sacred Heart in New York, where she studied architecture. While attending, she made friends with a group of hippies that were a part of Newsreel. At Newsreel, Choy worked as an editor and animation director for some amount of time.

Career 
In 1974, Choy directed her first documentary, which was called Teach Our Children. After working at Newsreel, she moved to a branch called Third World Newsreel. Because Choy was able to relate to the poverty and the migration issues that people around her faced, she was inspired to make another documentary, that fused the issues she faced while back in China and South Korea with the struggles she faced in the U.S. She finished the film, From Spikes to Spindles, in 1976. This film focused on Chinese migration, and focused on Chinese citizens being treated equally.

Choy was one of the first major Chinese American woman film makers. She is seen in both negative and positive light by her viewers. She is considered a political film maker and an activist.

One of Choy's most acclaimed films, Who Killed Vincent Chin?  (1988) is a multicultural film that was nominated for the Academy Award for Best Documentary Feature. She codirected this film with Renee Tajima. The film is based on a true story about Vincent Jen Chin, a Chinese American man who was beaten to death with a baseball bat by Ron Ebens and his stepson, Michael Nitz, who held Chin defenseless. Neither of the White men served a single day in prison. They were each sentenced to 3 years probation and a $3,000 fine. Choy struggled in seeking funding for this film due to its high tension subject matter, shedding light on working class racism in Detroit at a time when the US auto industry was failing and Japanese cars were gaining popularity. The film was a pioneer in reconfiguring ethnographic filmmaking and won several accolades.

Choy is well acclaimed for making another film dealing with minority discrimination. Sa-I-gu (1993), another film that Choy codirected, about the effect of the 1992 Los Angeles riots on the Korean American community there, directly deals with the racial animosity towards Asians in America, but more specifically Asian women.

After directing, Choy became a professor at Tisch School of Arts in New York City. She teaches a course called "Directing the Thesis" to third year students. She also has teaching experience at Yale, Cornell, and Buffalo State University of New York.

Awards
1988, Won: "Who Killed Vincent Chin?" Best Documentary, Hawaii International Film Festival
1989, Nominated: "Who Killed Vincent Chin?" Best Documentary, Features, Oscar
1989, Won: Asian Media Award
1989, Nominated: "Who Killed Vincent Chin?" Cinematography Award, Sundance Film Festival
1997, Won: "My America...or Honk If You Love Buddha" Cinematography Award, Sundance Film Festival
1998, Won: "The Shot Heard 'Round the World", Jury Award, Bangkok Film Festival 
2008, Won: "Long Story Short" Audience Award, Documentary Feature, VC FilmFest - Los Angeles Asian Pacific Film Festival
2008, Won: "Long Story Short" Honorable Mention, Documentary Feature, VC FilmFest - Los Angeles Asian Pacific Film Festival

Filmography 
Teach Our Children (1974)
Fresh Seeds in a Big Apple (1975)
Generation of a Railroad Spiker (1975)
From Spikes to Spindles (1976)
History of the Chinese Patriot Movement in the U.S. (1977)
North Country Tour (1977)
Inside Women Inside (1978)
Loose Pages Bound (1978)
A Dream Is What You Wake Up From (1978)
To Love, Honor, and Obey (1980)
White Flower Passing (1981)
Bittersweet Survival (1982)
Go Between (1982)
Mississippi Triangle (1982-83)
Fei Teir, Goddess in Flight (1983)
Namibia, Independence Now (1984)
Monkey King Looks West (1985)
Permanent Wave (1986)
Shanhai Lil's (1988)
Who Killed Vincent Chin? (1988)
Best Hotel on Skid Row (1989)
Fortune Cookie: The Myth of the Model Minority (1989)
Homes Apart:Korea (1991)
Sa-I-gu (1993)
The Shot Heard Round The World (1997)
Sparrow Village (2003)
No Fifth Grade (2007)
Miao Village Medicine (2007)

References

External links 

Catalog of available works from Third World Newsreel 

1952 births
Living people
Tisch School of the Arts faculty
Manhattanville College alumni
Educators from Shanghai
American filmmakers
Chinese people of Korean descent
Chinese emigrants to the United States
American people of Korean descent
American people of Chinese descent
American people of Macanese descent